= Khinchital =

- village
- Location within Madhya Pradesh Location within India
- Coordinates: 23.4298141°N 77.4472578°E
- Country: India
- State: Madhya Pradesh
- District: Bhopal
- Tehsil: Huzur
- Elevation: 481 m (1,578 ft)

Population (2011)
  - Total: 37
- Time zone: UTC+5:30 (IST)
- ISO 3166 code: MP-IN
- 2011 census code: 482395

Khinchital is a village in the Bhopal district of Madhya Pradesh, India. It is located in the Huzur tehsil and the Phanda block.

== Demographics ==
According to the 2011 census of India, Khinchital has 9 households. The effective literacy rate (i.e. the literacy rate of population excluding children aged 6 and below) is 55.88%.

Demographics (2011 Census)
	Total	Male	Female
Population	37	19	18
Children aged below 6 years	3	3	0
Scheduled caste	21	10	11
Scheduled tribe	14	8	6
Literates	19	9	10
Workers (all)	19	10	9
Main workers (total)	5	5	0
Main workers: Cultivators	4	4	0
Main workers: Agricultural labourers	1	1	0
Main workers: Household industry workers	0	0	0
Main workers: Other	0	0	0
Marginal workers (total)	14	5	9
Marginal workers: Cultivators	1	0	1
Marginal workers: Agricultural labourers	13	5	8
Marginal workers: Household industry workers	0	0	0
Marginal workers: Others	0	0	0
Non-workers	18	9	9
